Emilio Ramón Ramiro Flores Domínguez (born 5 February 1957) is a Mexican politician formerly affiliated with the National Action Party. As of 2014 he served as Deputy of the LX Legislature of the Mexican Congress representing Chihuahua.

References

1957 births
Living people
Politicians from Chihuahua (state)
National Action Party (Mexico) politicians
21st-century Mexican politicians
Monterrey Institute of Technology and Higher Education alumni
Deputies of the LX Legislature of Mexico
Members of the Chamber of Deputies (Mexico) for Chihuahua (state)